The following is a list of Registered Historic Places in Tuscola County, Michigan.



|}

See also

 List of Michigan State Historic Sites in Tuscola County, Michigan
 List of National Historic Landmarks in Michigan
 National Register of Historic Places listings in Michigan
 Listings in neighboring counties: Bay, Genesee, Huron, Lapeer, Saginaw, Sanilac

References

Tuscola County
Buildings and structures in Tuscola County, Michigan